Fek or FEK may refer to:
 Fek, Iran
 Fek, Nepal
 Feck, a vernacular term in Hiberno-English, Scots and Middle English
 Ferkessédougou Airport, in the Ivory Coast
 Government Gazette (Greece)